In music, Op. 156 stands for Opus number 156. Compositions that are assigned this number include:

 Lachner – Octet
 Robber – Die Räuberbraut
 Saint-Saëns – Cyprès et lauriers